Mijat Marić (born 30 April 1984) is a Swiss former footballer of Croatian descent, who played as a defender.

Career
Marić started his career at AC Lugano of Ticino, an Italian speaking region. After the bankrupt of the club, he joined FC Malcantone Agno. In summer 2003 he joined FC St. Gallen of Swiss Super League. He played 2 matches for the club before left on loan to FC Luzern until December 2007.

In March 2007, he signed a 3-year contract with Bari on free transfer, effective on 1 July 2008.

After not getting to playing any matches for Bari at Serie B, he left for K.A.S. Eupen of Belgian Second Division.

He played one year in K.A.S. Eupen and was voted for the best player in second tier of Belgium football.

In August 2018, Maric returned to Lugano after 10 years playing abroad.

Honours
Lokeren
Belgian Cup: 2011–12, 2013–14

Lugano
Swiss Cup: 2021–22

References

External links
 
 

Swiss men's footballers
Switzerland under-21 international footballers
Swiss expatriate footballers
Swiss Super League players
FC Lugano players
FC St. Gallen players
FC Luzern players
S.S.C. Bari players
K.A.S. Eupen players
K.S.C. Lokeren Oost-Vlaanderen players
Belgian Pro League players
Expatriate footballers in Italy
Expatriate footballers in Belgium
Association football defenders
Swiss people of Croatian descent
People from Locarno District
1984 births
Living people
Sportspeople from Ticino